Stolpersteine is the German name for small, cobble stone-sized memorials installed all over Europe by German artist Gunter Demnig. They remember the fate of the victims of Nazi Germany being murdered, deported, exiled or driven to suicide. The first Stolperstein in Genoa, the capital of the Italian region of Liguria, was installed in January 2012.

Generally, the stumbling blocks are posed in front of the building where the victims had their last self chosen residence. The Stolperstein for Riccardo Reuven Pacifici was installed at the site of his arrest. The name of the Stolpersteine in Italian is pietre d'inciampo.

Background
The short period of Nazi Germany ruling Italy from September 1943 to April 1945 left major traces of blood and sorrow. The major victims groups in Liguria were resistance fighters, people of Jewish origin and military personnel that did not adhere to the German controlled Italian Social Republic.

Finale Ligure

Genoa 
The Jews of Genoa lived, like all Jews of Italy, with limitations of their freedom and suffered periodic expulsions. The "ghetto" was moved to piazza dei Tessitori in 1674. In the 17th century it was planned to move it again, but an expulsion decree prevented the project. However, in recent history Italian Jews did not have to fear for their lives — except during the short and deadly period in which Nazi German occupied large parts of Italy.

The synagogue of Genoa was built in 1935 by architect Francesco Morandi. It is located in via Bertora, a few steps from via Assarotti. It was there that the Germans convened a meeting in November 1943. The intention of the Nazis was to arrest all Jews of Genoa in a single stroke. Fifty Jews appeared, among them were also chief rabbi Riccardo Pacifici, his wife and their children of 2 and 4 years. All detainees were deported to Auschwitz concentration camp on 3 November 1943 where they were all murdered.

Ronco Scrivia

Installation dates 
The Stolpersteine of Genova were all installed by Gunter Demnig personally. The installations took place at the following dates:
 29 January 2012: Galleria Mazzini
 7 March 2013: Via Roma 1
 14 January 2017: Via Carlo Barabino 26

See also 
 List of cities by country that have stolpersteine

External links

 Stolpersteine.eu, official website of Gunter Demnig

References

Liguria
Stolpersteine
Holocaust commemoration
Liguria
Genoa
2012 sculptures
2013 sculptures